The Sardinia national football team is the official football team of Sardinia. It is organised by the Sardinian National Sports Federation, founded in 2012. The team has been colloquially referred with the name .

Sardinia is not affiliated with either FIFA or UEFA and is therefore not allowed to participate in either the FIFA World Cup or the UEFA European Championship.

However, since 2018 the National Federation is associated with the CONIFA, therefore the team can participate in the CONIFA World Football Cup and in CONIFA European Football Cup.

History

The first two international matches 
The first official documented appearance of a Sardinian national team dates back to 1990. The England national football team was in Sardinia for a training camp in order to prepare the 1990 FIFA World Cup in Italy, where, among other things, it was to play two of the three group stage matches in Cagliari (against Egypt and Ireland). Therefore, an island representative XI was formed including the best Sardinian players playing between Serie C and Amateurs to face the Three Lions in their first friendly match. The first players to wear the jersey of the Sardinian national team, under the orders of Mariano Dessì, dean of the Sardinian coaches of that time, were Nioi as goalkeeper, Spano, Moro, Bortolini and Tomasso in defense, the future sporting director of Cagliari Calcio Francesco Marroccu, Martinez, Tolu and Ennas in the midfield, Corda and Gianfranco Zola, the only professional and at that time militant in fresh Scudetto's winners S.S.C. Napoli. In the second half, Toffolon, Laconi, Carta, Nieddu, Di Laura, Mura, Napoli, Fara, and Angioni also entered. The game ended 10–2 for England: curiously, Sardinia went ahead, but only thanks to a voluntary own goal by Steve McMahon in the first minute before the island players still touched the ball. This gesture metaphorically symbolized what would have been any violent actions of the Hooligans, the most frenzied fringe of English fans, at the time feared throughout Europe. After this demonstration, given the imbalance of power, the game was dominated by England who scored with McMahon himself, a hat-trick by Neil Webb and one by Peter Beardsley, a double by Steve Bull and a goal by David Platt. However, for Tomasso there was the glory of scoring the first goal in the history of the Natzionale.

Seven years were needed before watching again a Sardinian selection in a football field. In July 1997, at the Stadio Quadrivio in Nuoro, thanks to the Sardinian leader of the Sardinian separatist party Sardinia Nation Francesco Cesaraccio, a friendly match was organized between the national teams of the sister Islands, Sardinia and the Corsica national football team. Compared to previous calls-up against England, the roster contained several professional players and essentially the best of Sardinian football at the time. The manager was Gustavo Giagnoni who called Gianfranco Pinna and Giuseppe Nioi as keepers. In defense Gian Battista Scugugia, Vittorio Pusceddu, Gianluca Festa and Salvatore Matrecano. In midfield Pier Giovanni Rutzittu, Marco Sanna, Pietro Garau, Massimiliano Pani, Alessandro Manca, Igor Marziano and two sons of emigrants: the Sardinian-German Sergio Allievi and the Sardinian-Dutch Daniel Agus. In attack Gianfranco Zola, Tomaso Tatti, Roberto Manca, Roberto Cau, Emanuele Matzuzzi and another emigrant, the Sardinian-Belgian Antonio Lai. The goalkeeper Nioi and Zola were the only ones called in both appointments, thus becoming record holders in the caps ranking. The game itself had been balanced and Sardinia won by 1–0 with a goal at the twentieth minute of the second half by the future Chelsea F.C.'s striker Gianfranco Zola.

First attempts of association as international member 
History showed that the project of a National team of Sardinia remained occasional and it came back under the shadow. Only 11 years later it returned to talking about Nazionale Sarda. In 2008, in fact, in Gonnosfanadiga was founded the Lega Federale Calcio Sardegna (on the path of the Lega Federale Calcio Padania) by the tuscan Giampiero Sogus, son of a Sardinian migrant, with the involvement, as vice president of the Gonnosfanadiga's mayor Sisinnio Zanda at that time, as counselor the hotelier Marco Sardu and as secretary the lawyer Franco Loi. The League is immediately associated at the NF-Board, in that era the main board of the Non-FIFA international football, who organized the VIVA World Cup. While remaining officially affiliated with this confederation until its dissolution in 2008, no Sardinian national team will ever be formed, not even for friendly matches, except for an amateur tournament in Tuscany in which Sogus himself entered a team named "Sardinia" but with Tuscan players without island origins.

The FINS era and the affiliation to CONIFA 
In 2012, thanks to the cultural initiatives by Project Republic of Sardinia, another separatist party, the Sardinian National Sports Federation was created with the aim of creating Sardinian national selections, not only limited to football. The first experiences has been indeed related to the creation of the Sardinian futsal team, which played in 2012 and 2013 first at Fordongianus and then in Nuoro for some friendlies against the homologous selection of Catalonia.

Simultaneously, in 2013, due to the unfortunate occurrence of the Cyclone Cleopatra in Sardinia, which caused 19 victims, the Sardinian society returned to propose the establishment of a football selection, even if only for a charity match able to raise funds for the victims and for the reconstruction of the inhabited centers hit by the natural disaster. Vittorio Sanna, journalist from Assemini (one of the towns crashed by the disaster) but above all radio commentator of the Cagliari Calcio matches for the private radio station Radiolina, proposed himself for this organization and got in touch with the various professional Sardinian football players at the time. At the beginning the organization moved for a friendly match against Serie A's team Cagliari Calcio but the president Massimo Cellino did not give consent. Subsequently, an attempt was made to organize another friendly match against Corsica and the date was set for May of the following year, but eventually the plan had been abandoned.

Only 5 years later, the Sanna's projects and the FINS plans coincided and on 13 October 2018 the Federation announced the affiliation to the CONIFA, the maximum international organization for football not affiliated to FIFA, which groups all the "National teams without a State" and organizes, among other competitions, the CONIFA World Football Cup, a trophy that replaced the VIVA World Cup. Simultaneously with the entry into CONIFA, FINS announced its participation in the 2019 European Championships in Artsakh. The following week the new technical commissioner was announced, the Sardinian Bernardo Mereu, historical Sardinian coach who led island formations in the various professional and interregional championships.

The first game of the FINS era, the third in total of the history of the Natzionale, was held on 19 March 2019 at the Stadio Franco Frogheri in Nuoro against the Istrangios de Sardigna, a selection formed by the best foreign militants in the Sardinian amateur formations, and won by the Sardinians 7–1. Francesco Virdis from Savona F.B.C. scored a hat-trick, Daniele Molino from Sanremese, Samuele Spano, Toni Gianni and Daniele Bianchi one goal each. For the occasion, over 50 players were called: the professional clubs, however, given the current sporting season, did not give the "go-ahead" for participation. The squad was therefore composed only by amateur players with the exception of two Arzachena Costa Smeralda's players, Robert Acquafresca (FC Sion) and Paolo Dametto (FeralpiSalò) with the latter two sitting on the bench, though.

However, on 6 May 2019, FINS announced the withdrawal from participation in the 2019 CONIFA European Football Cup in Artsakh, accusing the absence of organizational and logistical guarantees to allow the Natzionale, composed by professional players, to face such a demanding trip, deciding to divert the commitment to the organization of the friendly match against Corsica. Despite the abandonment of the event, the federation has guaranteed the permanence in CONIFA.

On 25 January 2020, the FINS, the Sardinian Federation, announced the new coach Vittorio Pusceddu (former defender who played, among all the other teams in his career, for Cagliari Calcio, S.S.C. Napoli, A.C.F. Fiorentina and Torino F.C.) who took the place of Bernardo Mereu after one year of management.

In 2022 the federation planned to compete in 2022 CONIFA European Football Cup and the team was drawn with County of Nice and Two Sicilies, but eventually in May they decide to withdraw from the tournament due to safety reasons and moving to the planning of an International Tournèe against Corsica, Sicily and Malta, with the latter that could be the first UEFA opponent in their history after the first inaugural match against England.

Colours and crest

Colours 
From the FINS era, the main color used is light green, according to the federation "a historical reminder and a wish that Sardinia will return, also in the football field, to a period of cultural and economic prosperity, playing and opening up in first person to the world".

Crest 
The emblem of the Natzionale is a rounded shield with different elements taken from the Sardinian culture. In the upper part, on a green background there is the lettering, in Sardinian language, "Natzionale Sarda de Bòcia". In the main part there are the classic Quattro mori' although with the Saint George's cross in green version instead of red. At the center of the cross then, set in a green pentagon extrapolated from the iconic standard of the soccer ball, a stylized eradicated tree, symbol of the Judicate of Arborea , the last entity representing the independent Sardinia and symbol that still characterizes the coats of arms in the most different variants of more than 80 municipalities of the island.

Kits 
In the first match against England in 1990 the Sardinian XI played with a white jersey with blue details and a polo-style collar, while the shorts were red. In the second experience in 1997 the formation used a total red suit with a large flag of the four Moors in the chest. In 2018, with the rebuilding of the National team, the new official jerseys, produced by the made in Sardinia technical sponsor Eye Sportswear, were presented. For the home jersey was chosen a white uniform embellished with green details, colours derived by the Judicate of Arborea and a pattern inspired by the typical embroidery of Sardinian craftsmanship in the central part of the shirt. Meanwhile, for the away jersey, it was decided to a completely red uniform with white lapels, in honor of the flag of the four Moors.

Evolution

Captains 
 1990: Gianfranco Zola
 1997: Vittorio Pusceddu
 2019–: Claudio Pani

Managers 
 1990: Mariano Dessì
 1997: Gustavo Giagnoni
 2018–2020: Bernardo Mereu
 2020- : Vittorio Pusceddu

Competitive record

CONIFA World Football Cup

CONIFA European Football Cup

Players

Current squad 

Below is the list of players called by coach Vittorio Pusceddu for the friendly match against Sicily on 10 June 2022 .

Caps, goals and numbers as per 10 June 2022.

Recent call-ups

The following players were called up in previous fixtures and are still avavilable for selection.

Fixtures and results 
This is a list of results for the matches played since 1990, including friendly matches against full FIFA international teams and others against fellow representative teams which are not aligned to FIFA and against professional or amateur clubs.

Individual records 

As of 10 June 2022, players in bold are still active within the selection.

References

External links
Sardinia - CONIFA official website
Federatzione Isport Natzionale Sardu (FINS) – Official website
FINS Twitter Page

European N.F.-Board teams
Football teams in Italy
national
CONIFA member associations
European national and official selection-teams not affiliated to FIFA